Hemiphyllodactylus zhutangxiangensis is a species of gecko. It is endemic to Yunnan (China). It is named after its type locality, Zhutang Township.

References

Hemiphyllodactylus
Reptiles of China
Endemic fauna of Yunnan
Reptiles described in 2021
Taxa named by Jesse L. Grismer
Taxa named by Larry Lee Grismer